The Commercial (Third) functional constituency is a functional constituency in the elections for the Legislative Council of Hong Kong first created in 2021. Derived from the former Hong Kong Chinese Enterprises Association Subsector in the Election Committee, the constituency is composed of 288 corporate members of the Hong Kong Chinese Enterprises Association entitled to vote at general meetings of the Association.

Return members

Electoral results

2020s

References

Constituencies of Hong Kong
Constituencies of Hong Kong Legislative Council
Functional constituencies (Hong Kong)
2021 establishments in Hong Kong
Constituencies established in 2021